Sammie Okposo (30 May 1971 – 25 November 2022) was a Nigerian gospel artist. 

Okposo was also a music producer, psalmist, and CEO of Zamar Entertainment. He released his debut album, Unconditional love in 2000 and his sophomore album Addicted in 2004. 

Okposo collaborated with many other artists in the gospel and soul music fields, he collaborated with popular gospel singer Marvellous Odiete on "Follow You" and American gospel singer  Jonathan Nelson on Oghene Doh, has performed regularly in Africa, Europe, and North America, and curated a series of concerts called SOPP (Sammie Okposo Praise Party). His most recent album, The Statement (2018), was produced by the Grammy-winning Kevin Bond.

Career 
In 1992, Okposo became a soundtrack producer in the Nigerian movie industry. This was the official start of his career as a producer. He then switched to making music.

When he released his first album, "Unconditional Love," in 2000, with the hit single "Welu-Welu," he shook up the music business.  Okposo was known all over the world and won many awards in Nigeria.

Personal life and death
Okposo issued a public apology to his wife, Ozioma, via his Instagram page on 24 January 2022, following his infidelity. The apology came a day after a lady, known only as African Doll, accused him of impregnating and abandoning her. Okposo told his fans that he would be taking a step back from his ministry to focus on restoration and seek forgiveness. He initially deactivated his social media handles, but restored them a few days later.

Okposo died on 25 November 2022, at the age of 51.

Awards and recognition

References

External links
 
 

1971 births
2022 deaths
20th-century Christians
20th-century Nigerian male singers
21st-century Christians
21st-century Nigerian  male singers
Nigerian evangelicals
Nigerian gospel singers